Massachusetts is the third studio album by American alternative country group Scud Mountain Boys. Released in 1996 on Sub Pop, Massachusetts was recorded and mixed at Studio .45 in Hartford, Connecticut, except for the track "Grudge ****", which was recorded on a four track at home.

Critical reception
The Encyclopedia of Popular Music called the album an "excellent alternative country epic." Entertainment Weekly wrote: "With songs of drunken regret and clear-eyed desperation that are closer to John Cheever than George Jones, the album’s slyly beautiful melodies and parched entreaties have the bracing chill of a Nor’east wind." Spin called it an "all-depression alt-country gem." Trouser Press deemed it "an atmospheric marvel — fully arranged, languidly delivered and occasionally branded by artful lead-guitar electricity."

Track listing

Personnel
 Mike Deming - Engineer, Mastering, Organ, Producer
 Stephen Desaulniers - Bass, Bass (Acoustic), Composer, Guitar, Guitar (Acoustic), Guitar (Electric), Guitar (Rhythm), Piano, Producer, Vocals, Vocals (Background)
 Thom Monahan - Drums, Engineer, Overdubs, Producer
 Bob Pernice - Guitar
 Joe Pernice - Composer, Guitar (Acoustic), Guitar (Electric), Producer, Vocals
 Paul Rocha - Piano 
 Tom Shea - Drums, Guitar (Electric), Mandolin, Producer
 Bruce Tull - Guitar (Electric), Pedal Steel, Photography, Producer
 Steve Wytas - Mastering

References 

1996 albums
Sub Pop albums